"Until It's Gone" is a song written by American rock band Linkin Park. The song was originally recorded by the band for their sixth studio album, The Hunting Party, where it appears as the seventh track on the album. Produced by Mike Shinoda and Brad Delson, the track also appears on the single of the same name, which was released by Warner Bros. Records and Machine Shop on May 6, 2014. The single is the second to be released in promotion of The Hunting Party. The single is also included in the music for the action-adventure video game Transformers: Rise of the Dark Spark, which was released on June 24, 2014.

Background and release

In a preview for the album by Rolling Stone, the song was explained as, "Until It's Gone" kicks off with the sort of warbling synth effect that was the group's calling card on their 2000 breakthrough debut, Hybrid Theory, but builds into a brooding, textured gloom rocker that reminds listeners, via singer Chester Bennington, that "[you] don't know what you've got until it's gone." In another preview by Loudwire the single is explained as "it's a more mid-tempo track with softer lyrics provided by Chester Bennington, who really shows his vocal versatility. The dreamy and atmospheric sounds are enough to whisk you away but Bennington brings you back down to earth as he belts out their take on a familiar chorus." The song continues its outro into The Hunting Party's eighth track and fourth single, "Rebellion" with System of a Down guitarist, Daron Malakian.

Composition 
"Until Its Gone" is described to be an alternative rock, electronic rock and gothic rock song. Lyrically, the song is about a failed relationship lead vocalist Chester Bennington has been in. AltWire explains it as a "beginning with a synth line similar to 'Numb' from the 2003 album Meteora, taking a sharp turn to an unexpected brooding goth rock anthem, proving to be one of the songs on the 6-track sampler of The Hunting Party in recent memory with a choir-like backing vocals and intense orchestral backdrops that stays and impacts after 'it's gone.'"

Reception
In a track-by-track review by Billboard, the song was given a positive response and explained as "So returns the warped sonar synth effect heard on hits like 'Numb', and while it arrives in the opening seconds amid a rush of heavy guitars, 'Until It's Gone' quickly turns into a philosophical electro-rock mood piece. The buildup of blips in the bridge hints at a coming bass drop, but then the guitars kick back in, and Bennington belts out his clichéd lyrics for the middle schoolers in the cheap seats who don't know any better."

Music video
A lyric video to accompany the track was premiered on YouTube on May 5, 2014. Directed by Austin Saya, the three-minute video was shot in Los Angeles, California. An official music video was then released on June 11, 2014, directed by Joe Hahn. The video was premiered on the band's official Facebook page, and is now uploaded on their official YouTube channel. The video received a nomination at MTV Video Music Awards 2014 in the category for "Best Rock Video".

As of December 2022, the music video for "Until It's Gone" has over 45 million views on YouTube.

Track listing

Personnel

Linkin Park
 Chester Bennington – lead vocals
 Mike Shinoda – backing vocals, rhythm guitar, keyboards
 Brad Delson – lead guitar
 Dave "Phoenix" Farrell – bass guitar, backing vocals
 Joe Hahn – sampling, programming
 Rob Bourdon – drums, percussion

Technical personnel
Ethan Mates – engineering

Charts

Weekly charts

Year-end charts

Release history

References

External links
 

2014 songs
Linkin Park songs
Songs written by Mike Shinoda
2014 singles
Songs from Transformers (film series)
Video game theme songs
Electronic rock songs
Gothic rock songs
Warner Records singles